This is the list of snake species that can be found in Albania. From Albania 17 snake species are known.

With the European horned viper, which can be found in almost all of Albania, Europe's most venomous snake species is also found here, whose bite can be fatal for humans.

Sources 

Albania
Snake